Gladys Amelia Anslow (May 22, 1892 – March 31, 1969) was an American physicist who spent her career at Smith College. She was the first woman to work with the cyclotron.

Early life and education 
Born in Springfield, Massachusetts, Anslow attended Springfield Central High School and entered Smith College in 1909. While studying at Smith College, Anslow was a member of the Mathematical Society and served as vice president of the Physics Club. In her second year, Anslow elected a focus on physics under Frank Allan Waterman. Following her graduation with an A.B. in 1914, Anslow was appointed as a Department of Physics demonstrator (1914–15) and then an assistant in physics (1915–17).  In 1916 she began her graduate studies in advanced physics under Smith professor Janet T. Howell, taking Howell's course in spectroscopy. Howell introduced Anslow to the new Rowland grating spectrograph acquired by Smith College to research the emission spectra of radium, resulting in Anslow's thesis "Spectroscopic Evidence for the Electron Theory of Matter". Anslow graduated in 1917 with her A.M. Following her graduation, she was appointed instructor in physics to replace Howell.

Career 
Anslow obtained a Ph.D. from Yale University in 1924 and upon graduation returned to Smith as an associate professor, attaining the role of full professor in 1930. In 1940, Anslow became Director of Graduate Study, followed by Professor on the Gates Foundation in 1946, and Professor Emeritus in 1960. During her tenure at Smith, Anslow frequently contributed to scientific journals and was a member of both the American Academy of for the Advancement of Science and the American Physical Society, where she was the president of the New England Section.

The first woman to work with the cyclotron ("atomic whirligig to smash the atom") at UC Berkeley, she collaborated with fellow Smith physicist Dorothy Wrinch on a "spectrochemical study of protein molecules for the eventual production of synthetic foods and drugs" under a grant from the Office of Naval Research, the first research grant of its kind at Smith College. During World War II, Anslow was named Chief of Communications and Information Section for Liaison with Civilian Scientists and attached to the armed forces.

Honors 
For this work she was awarded the President's Certificate of Merit one of only three educators so honored. She was elected a Fellow of the American Physical Society in 1936 and a Fellow of the American Academy of Arts and Sciences in 1955.

References

External links 

 Gladys Amelia Anslow papers, Smith College Archives, Smith College Special Collections

1892 births
1969 deaths
People from Springfield, Massachusetts
Smith College alumni
Smith College faculty
Yale University alumni
20th-century American physicists
Fellows of the American Academy of Arts and Sciences
Fellows of the American Physical Society